Fatih Mehmet Maçoğlu (Also known as 'The Communist Mayor') (born 20 December 1968, Çemberlitaş, Ovacık District) is a Turkish communist politician of Zaza-Kurdish descent and founder of Socialist Councils Federation (SMF). He is currently the mayor of Tunceli representing the Communist Party of Turkey (TKP).

Early life and education 
He was born in the village Çemberlitaş in Tunceli province in December 1968 and attended primary school in Ovacik and health high school in Bingöl.

Professional career 
From 1989 onwards he worked in healthcare. First in Bozkir in Konya and between 1992 and 2007 in Pertek, Tunceli. From 2007 onwards he worked in emergency care in the Tunceli state hospital. He resigned from his work in hospital in order to stand as a mayoral candidate for Ovacik in the local elections of 2014.

Political career 
He was elected mayor of Ovacık in 2014, where he was known for implementing initiatives like free public transport and agricultural projects such as bee keeping and chickpea cultivation with which the gains supported university students. He also encouraged the opening of several libraries in Ovacık. In the local elections in 2019, he was elected mayor of Tunceli, the province's capital.

Personal life 
He is married and has two children.

References 

1968 births
Living people
Turkish communists
Mayors of places in Turkey
Turkish Kurdish politicians
Turkish people of Kurdish descent
People from Tunceli Province